Kristina Ortez is an American politician and non-profit executive serving as a member of the New Mexico House of Representatives from the 42nd district. Elected in 2020, she assumed office on January 19, 2021.

Early life and education 
Ortez was raised in farming community in the San Joaquin Valley. In 1989, she attended UC Davis' Young Scholars Program and went on to earn a Bachelor of Arts from Harvard University and a Master of Public Administration from the University of New Mexico.

Career 
Prior to entering politics, Ortez worked as the executive director of the Taos Land Trust.

After incumbent Democratic representative Roberto Gonzales was nominated to the New Mexico Senate by Michelle Lujan Grisham, he was replaced by Taos Mayor Daniel R. Barrone. Barrone later announced that he would not seek a full term in the House in 2020, and Ortez declared her candidacy to succeed him. In the June Democratic primary, she defeated Mark Gallegos. In the November general election, she defeated Republican Linda Calhoun. She assumed office in January 2021.

References 

Living people
People from Taos, New Mexico
Harvard University alumni
Hispanic and Latino American state legislators in New Mexico
Hispanic and Latino American women in politics
University of New Mexico alumni
Democratic Party members of the New Mexico House of Representatives
Year of birth missing (living people)
Place of birth missing (living people)
21st-century American politicians
21st-century American women politicians
Women state legislators in New Mexico